Su fei-erh was a Muslim Bukharan Emir who was invited into China by the Song dynasty Emperor and given a title of Prince by the Chinese Emperor. He played a critical role in forming the Muslim Hui people in China and giving the Islamic religion its current name in Chinese.

Name
Su fei-erh was his name in Chinese; Su Fei'er and So-fei-er are other romanisations of his name. His name has variously been reconstructed in his original language as Safar, Sufair, or Zubair.

Life
The Song Dynasty hired Muslim warriors from Bukhara to fight against Khitan nomads. 5,300 Muslim men from Bukhara were encouraged and invited to move to China in 1070 by  the Song emperor Shenzong to help battle the Liao empire in the northeast  and repopulate areas ravaged by fighting. The emperor hired these men as mercenaries in his campaign against the Liao empire. Later on these men were encouraged to settle between the Song capital of Kaifeng and Liao capital of Yanjing (modern day Beijing) in order to create a buffer zone. China's northern and northeastern provinces were settled by Muslims in 1080 when 10,000 more Muslims were invited into China. They were led by the Amir of Bukhara, Sayyid "So-fei-er" in Chinese. He is called the "Father" of Chinese Islam. Islam was named by the Tang and Song Chinese as the "law of the Arabs". Su fei-erh gave Islam the new name of "the religion of the Huihui".

Descendants
Many of Su fei-erh's descendants have wielded political power and prestige from the 12th century to the 19th century. One of the sons of Su fei-erh was appointed governor of Shandong while a grandson called Shams Shah was given the title of "Protector of the Tatars". Kamal al-Din, a great grandson, was made commander-in-chief of the army under Emperor Gaozong. In turn, Kamal's son Mahmud served as governor of Yunnan and Shaanxi. Further descendants were also appointed into high positions within the Song dynasty.

Su fei-erh is alleged by the Fa-hsiang to be the ancestor of Sayyid Ajjal Shams al-Din Omar (who was descended from the Prophet Muhammad), however, some were skeptical of this claim and think it was a forgery to mask Sayyid Ajjal's arrival to China with the Mongols.

See also
 History of Bukhara
 Hui people
 Islam during the Song dynasty
 Sayyid Ajjal Shams al-Din Omar
 Western Regions

Notes

References

Works cited

 
 
 
 

Song dynasty politicians
Chinese Muslims
People from Bukhara
Hui people